Neon Nights Electric Lives is the first proper full-length release from Vermont's The Static Age. Though The Cost of Living recordings predated it, those are considered the band's demos. A limited version of Neon Nights Electric Lives was released on October 19th, 2004 and sold only on tours, but a full release came on March 23, 2005 via Tarantulas Records. The extended album also includes remixes from Jade Puget of AFI and Dave Walsh of The Explosion/The Loved Ones, and a vinyl reissue of the album was released in March 2014 on Highwires.

Track listing

Personnel
Andrew Paley - Voice, Guitars
Adam Meilleur - Bass
Bobby Hackney - Drums
Marie Whiteford - Keyboards
Produced, Engineered and Mixed by Matt Squire
Mastered by UE Nastasi at Sterling Sound/NYC
Art & Design by Ryan Johnson, with Andrew Paley and Tim Presley
Released on Tarantulas Records in March, 2005

References

The Static Age albums
2005 albums
Albums produced by Matt Squire